The following is a comprehensive discography of Roni Size & Reprazent, a British drum and bass group. The group released an EP in 1996. They released their debut studio album, New Forms, in 1997 with four singles, followed by In the Møde in 2000 with three singles. A 1997 remix album was also released. A 2008 re-release of their debut album, New Forms², was released with one single. Recently, in 2015, they released a live album.

Albums

Studio albums

Re-releases

Compilation albums

Live albums

Extended plays

Singles

References

Discographies of British artists
Electronic music discographies